WOWZ was a broadcast radio station licensed to Appomattox, Virginia, serving Appomattox and Appomattox County, Virginia. WOWZ was owned and operated by Perception Media Group, Inc.

Sale
On March 4, 2010, WOWZ's owners, Perception Media Group, Inc., began the process to sell WOWZ to OneCom, Inc. for $10,000.

The station's owners surrendered the license for WOWZ to the Federal Communications Commission on November 10, 2014; the FCC cancelled the license on November 18, 2014.

References

External links

OWZ
1974 establishments in Virginia
2014 disestablishments in Virginia
Radio stations established in 1974
Radio stations disestablished in 2014
Defunct radio stations in the United States
OWZ
OWZ